The meadow pipit (Anthus pratensis) is a small passerine bird, which breeds in much of the Palearctic, from southeastern Greenland and Iceland east to just east of the Ural Mountains in Russia, and south to central France and Romania; an isolated population also occurs in the Caucasus Mountains. It is migratory over most of its range, wintering in southern Europe, North Africa, and south-western Asia, but is resident year-round in western Europe, though even here many birds move to the coast or lowlands in winter.

Taxonomy
The meadow pipit was formally described by Swedish naturalist Carl Linnaeus in 1758 in the 10th edition of his Systema Naturae under the binomial name Alauda pratensis. The type locality is Sweden. The meadow pipit is now the type species of the  genus Anthus that was introduced in 1805 by German naturalist Johann Matthäus Bechstein. The species is monotypic; no subspecies are recognised.

The generic name Anthus is the Latin name for a small bird of grasslands mentioned by Pliny the Elder, and the specific name pratensis means "of a meadow ", from pratum,  "meadow". The name "pipit", first documented by Thomas Pennant in 1768, is onomatopoeic, from the call note of this species.  Old folk names, no longer used, include "chit lark", "peet lark", "tit lark", and "titling"; these refer to its small size and superficial similarity to a lark.

Description

It is an undistinguished-looking species on the ground, mainly brown above and buff below, with darker streaking on most of its plumage; the tail is brown, with narrow white side edges. It has a thin bill and pale pinkish-yellow legs; the hind claw is notably long, longer than the rest of the hind toes. The call is a weak tsi-tsi. The simple repetitive song is given in a short song flight. Birds breeding in Ireland and western Scotland are slightly darker coloured than those in other areas, and are often distinguished as the subspecies A. p. whistleri, though it intergrades clinally with nominate A. p. pratensis found in the rest of the species' range.

It is similar to the red-throated pipit A. cervinus, which is more heavily streaked and (in summer only) has an orange-red throat, and to the tree pipit A. trivialis, which is slightly larger, less heavily streaked, and has stronger facial markings and a shorter hind claw. The song of the meadow pipit accelerates towards the end while that of the tree pipit slows down.

Distribution and habitat

It is primarily a species of open habitats, either uncultivated or low-intensity agriculture, such as pasture, bogs, and moorland, but also occurs in low numbers in arable croplands. In winter, it also uses saltmarshes and sometimes open woodlands. It is a fairly terrestrial pipit, always feeding on the ground, but uses elevated perches such as shrubs, fence lines, or electricity wires as vantage points to watch for predators.

The estimated total population is 12 million pairs. It is an abundant species in the north of its range, and generally the commonest breeding bird in most of upland Britain, but less common further south. A few isolated breeding pairs are recorded from south of the main range, in the mountains of Spain, Italy, and the northern Balkans. A general decline in the population has occurred over the past 17 years, most notable in French farmland, with a 68% drop.

Behaviour

Breeding

The nest is on the ground hidden in dense vegetation, with two to seven (most often three to five) eggs; the eggs hatch after 11–15 days, with the chicks fledging 10–14 days after hatching. Two broods are commonly raised each year. This species is one of the most important nest hosts of the cuckoo, and it is also an important prey species for merlins and hen harriers.

Food and feeding
It also eats the seeds of grasses, sedges, rushes, and heather, and crowberry berries, mainly in winter.

Gallery

References

External links

 Meadow pipit videos, photos & sounds on the Internet Bird Collection
Ageing and sexing (PDF; 1.8 MB) by Javier Blasco-Zumeta & Gerd-Michael Heinze

meadow pipit
Birds of Europe
Birds of North Africa
meadow pipit
meadow pipit
Holarctic birds